The Lady in Ermine is a  1927 American silent romantic drama film directed by James Flood and produced by and starring Corinne Griffith, and distributed by First National Pictures. The film is now considered a lost film.

Play
The operetta The Lady in Ermine, upon which this film and later films are based, opened on Broadway October 2, 1922 and ran for 238 performances closing on April 21, 1923. It originally played at the Ambassador Theatre and then at the Century Theatre. The famous Shubert Brothers produced the operetta/play.

Cast
 Corinne Griffith as Mariana Beltrami
 Einar Hanson as Adrian Murillo
 Ward Crane as Archduke Stephan
 Francis X. Bushman as Gen. Dostal
 Jane Keckley as Mariana's maid
 Bert Sprotte as Sergeant Major (uncredited)

Remakes
The story was remade as an early talkie musical in Technicolor, Bride of the Regiment (1930), also released by First National and also considered a lost film. It was remade again in 1948 by 20th Century-Fox as That Lady in Ermine, starring Betty Grable and Douglas Fairbanks, Jr.

See also
 Francis X. Bushman filmography
 List of lost films

References

External links

 
 
 
 
 Lobby poster lithograph for The Lady in Ermine
 Stills at silenthollywood.com

1927 films
American silent feature films
First National Pictures films
Films directed by James Flood
American romantic drama films
Films set in Italy
Films set in the 19th century
1927 romantic drama films
American black-and-white films
Films based on operettas
Lost American films
1920s historical romance films
American historical romance films
1927 lost films
Lost romantic drama films
1920s American films
Silent romantic drama films
Silent American drama films
1920s English-language films
Silent historical romance films